The Municipality of Concord was a local government area of Sydney, New South Wales, Australia. It was proclaimed as a municipality on 11 August 1883, and covered the suburbs of Cabarita, Concord, Concord West, Liberty Grove, Mortlake, North Strathfield and Rhodes. In 2000, it merged with Drummoyne Council to become the City of Canada Bay Council.

References

Concord
Concord
Concord